Cicely Jevon Kyle (born October 12, 1984) is an American weightlifter. She is a two-time medalist, including gold, at the Pan American Weightlifting Championships.

Career 

In December 2015, she received a two-year sanction for an anti-doping rule violation.

In 2020, she won the gold medal in the women's 45kg event at the Roma 2020 World Cup in Rome, Italy.

In 2021, she won the gold medal in the women's 45kg event at the 2020 Pan American Weightlifting Championships held in Santo Domingo, Dominican Republic. She also set a new American record in the Clean and Jerk with a lift of 96 kg. She won the silver medal in her event at the 2022 Pan American Weightlifting Championships held in Bogotá, Colombia.

In 2022, she competed in the women's 45kg event at the World Weightlifting Championships in Bogotá, Colombia.

Achievements

References

External links 
 

Living people
1984 births
Place of birth missing (living people)
American female weightlifters
American sportspeople in doping cases
Doping cases in weightlifting
Pan American Weightlifting Championships medalists
21st-century American women